Elizabeth Campbell may refer to:

Betty Campbell (1934–2017), Welsh schoolteacher
Elizabeth Campbell (television) (1902–2004), American public television pioneer
Elizabeth Campbell, 1st Baroness Hamilton of Hameldon (1733–1790), Irish belle and society hostess
Elizabeth Campbell, Duchess of Argyll (1824–1878), Mistress of the Robes to Queen Victoria
Elizabeth Macquarie (1778–1835), née Campbell, wife of Lachlan Macquarie, Governor of New South Wales
Elizabeth Henry Campbell Russell (1749–1825)
Elizabeth Murray Campbell Smith Inman (1726–1785), American shopkeeper, teacher, philanthropist and proto-feminist
Liza Campbell (Lady Elizabeth Campbell, born 1959), artist
Elizabeth Campbell, a character in The General's Daughter
Elizabeth Campbell (poet) (born 1980), Australian poet
Elizabeth (Bessie) Campbell (1870–1964), Australian banjo player

See also
Beth Campbell (disambiguation)
Campbell (surname)